Mikhail Pavlovich Sablin (June 17, 1869 - October 17, 1920), was an admiral in the Imperial Russian Navy, the first independent Ukrainian Navy and a member of the White Russian Movement.

Biography
Sablin was born into a naval family in Sevastopol, his father was Vice Admiral Pavel Sablin and his brother Nikolai Pavlovich Sablin was also a naval officer.

Sablin graduated from the Sea Cadet Corps in Petrograd during 1890 and was assigned to the Russian Black Sea Fleet. He was later posted to China where he participated in the suppression of the Boxer Rebellion.

After repatriation to Russia after the end of the war, he again served with the Black Sea Fleet, commanding a destroyer and a gunboat before being given the command of the battleship  in 1912.

During World War I Sablin commanded the cruiser squadron of the Black Sea Fleet, and took part in numerous combat actions against the Imperial German Navy and Ottoman Navy, for which he was awarded the Order of Saint George for his valour. He was promoted to Chief of Staff of the Black Sea Fleet in 1917.

After the Russian Revolution Sablin took command of the Black Sea Fleet early in 1918. He raised the colours of the Ukrainian National Republic on 29 April  1918. In May 1918 the Germans invaded the Crimea and Sablin moved a portion of his fleet (two battleships and fourteen destroyers) to Novorossiysk in order to save it from capture. He was ordered to scuttle his ships by Lenin but refused to do so, travelling to Moscow in order to plead his case. Sablin was arrested and imprisoned by the Bolsheviks but escaped in August 1918 and made his way via the United Kingdom to join Pavlo Skoropadskyi's anti-Bolshevik forces in the Crimea. Sablin commanded the naval forces of the White Movement but was invalided out due to ill health in 1920. He died of liver cancer in Yalta on October 17 and was buried in Sevastopol.

References

This article was translated from Ukrainian Wikipedia
page in Russian language from Hronos

1869 births
1920 deaths
Imperial Russian Navy admirals
Ukrainian admirals
Russian military personnel of the Boxer Rebellion
Russian military personnel of the Russo-Japanese War
Russian military personnel of World War I
White movement admirals
People from Sevastopol
Deaths from liver cancer
Deaths from cancer in Russia
Naval Cadet Corps alumni